The fourth season of the French version of Dancing with the Stars premiered on TF1 on September 28, 2013. Like the previous season, 10 celebrities were paired with 10 professional ballroom dancers. Sandrine Quétier and Vincent Cerutti return as the hosts for this season.

Participants
The participants of the season were officially announced by TF1 on September 10, 2013 through an online event, though they'd been gradually revealed by various media outlets between April 15 and August 23 and several celebrities had spoken freely of their participation in the press prior to the official reveal.

Scoring

Red numbers indicate the couples with the lowest score for each week.
Blue numbers indicate the couples with the highest score for each week.
 indicates the couples eliminated that week.
 indicates the returning couple that finished in the bottom two.
 indicates the winning couple.
 indicates the runner-up couple.
 indicates the third place couple.

Averages 
This table only counts dances scored on the traditional 40-point scale. Starting from week 3, both technical and artistic scores are tallied.

Highest and lowest scoring performances
The best and worst performances in each dance according to the judges' marks are as follows (starting from week 3, an average between technical and artistic score is used):

Couples' Highest and lowest scoring performances
According to the traditional 40-point scale. (starting from week 3, an average between technical and artistic score is used):

Styles, scores and songs

Week 1 

 Individual judges scores in the chart below (given in parentheses) are listed in this order from left to right:: Marie-Claude Pietragalla, Jean-Marc Généreux, Shy'm, Chris Marques.

Running order

Week 2: Personal Story Week 

 Individual judges scores in the chart below (given in parentheses) are listed in this order from left to right:: Marie-Claude Pietragalla, Jean-Marc Généreux, Shy'm, Chris Marques.

Running order

Week 3: New Dances Week 

 Individual judges scores in the chart below (given in parentheses) are listed in this order from left to right:: Marie-Claude Pietragalla, Jean-Marc Généreux, Shy'm, Chris Marques.

Running order

Week 4: Idol Week 

 Individual judges scores in the chart below (given in parentheses) are listed in this order from left to right:: Marie-Claude Pietragalla, Jean-Marc Généreux, Shy'm, Chris Marques.

Running order

Week 5: Dance Fusion Week 

 Individual judges scores in the chart below (given in parentheses) are listed in this order from left to right:: Marie-Claude Pietragalla, Jean-Marc Généreux, Shy'm, Chris Marques.

Running order

Week 6: 15 Second Solo Week 

 Individual judges scores in the chart below (given in parentheses) are listed in this order from left to right:: Marie-Claude Pietragalla, Jean-Marc Généreux, Shy'm, Chris Marques.

Running order

Week 7: Dance trio week 

 Individual judges scores in the chart below (given in parentheses) are listed in this order from left to right:: Marie-Claude Pietragalla, Jean-Marc Généreux, Shy'm, Chris Marques.

Running order

Week 8: Semi-finals 

 Individual judges scores in the chart below (given in parentheses) are listed in this order from left to right:: Marie-Claude Pietragalla, Jean-Marc Généreux, Shy'm, Chris Marques.

Running order

Week 9: Finals 

 Individual judges scores in the chart below (given in parentheses) are listed in this order from left to right:: Marie-Claude Pietragalla, Jean-Marc Généreux, Shy'm, Chris Marques.

Running order

Call-Out Order 
The Table Lists in which order the contestants' fates were revealed by Quétier and Cerutti.

 This couple came in first place with the judges.
 This couple came in last place with the judges but were saved.
 This couple came in last place with the judges and was eliminated.
 This couple were in danger but was saved.
 This couple was eliminated.
 This couple won the competition.
 This couple came in second in the competition.
 This couple came in third in the competition.

Dance Chart
The celebrities and professional partners danced one of these routines for each corresponding week.
 Week 1 : Cha-Cha-Cha, Contemporary dance, Tango or Quickstep
 Week 2 : American Smooth, Cha-Cha-Cha, Contemporary dance, Foxtrot, Pasodoble or Rumba (Personal Story week)
 Week 3 : Bollywood, Bolero, Boogie-woogie, Disco dancing, Flamenco or Jazz dance (New Dances week)
 Week 4 : Cha-Cha-Cha, Contemporary dance, Foxtrot, Jive, Quickstep, Rumba, Tango or Waltz (Idol week)
 Week 5 : Cha-Cha-Cha, Contemporary dance, Foxtrot, Jive, Paso Doble, Rumba or Samba (Dance Fusion week)
 Week 6 : Bolero, Cha-Cha-Cha, Contemporary dance, Flamenco, Rumba, Samba, Tango or Waltz (15 Second Solo week)
 Week 7 : American smooth, Charleston, Foxtrot, Jive, Quickstep, Rumba, Salsa, Samba, Waltz (Trio week)
 Week 8 : Cha-Cha-Cha, Foxtrot, Jive, Paso Doble, Quickstep, Rumba, Salsa, Tango, Waltz (Semi-finals)
 Week 9 : Cha-Cha-Cha, Foxtrot, Jive, Paso Doble, Rumba, Samba (Finals)

 Highest scoring dance
 Lowest scoring dance
 Danced, but not scored

Musical Guests

France television ratings

Notes

References

Season 04
2013 French television seasons